Agusan del Sur, officially the Province of Agusan del Sur (Butuanon: Probinsya hong Agusan del Sur), is a province in Caraga region, Mindanao, Philippines. Its capital is the municipality of Prosperidad. It is bordered on the northwest by Agusan del Norte and Misamis Oriental; east by Surigao del Sur; southeast by Davao Oriental; mid-south by Davao de Oro; southwest by Davao del Norte and, mid-west by Bukidnon. It is the fourth largest province in the country in terms of area.

Etymology
Agusan derives its name from the Agusan word agasan, meaning "where the water flows", referring to the Agusan River that splits the land and meanders south to north in a  rush to Butuan Bay. It is third largest river in the country and served as highway for the Spanish colonizers in gaining access to inner northeastern Mindanao.

History
The Agusan Valley was settled by a variety of cultural communities like the Manobos, Mamanwas and Higaonons. Archeological excavations in the lower Agusan valley plains have uncovered evidence of strong relationships between the region and the Southeast Asian states. A golden image of Javan-Indian design unearthed in the 1920s and molten jars uncovered in Prosperidad are indications that the region had commercial and cultural ties with the coast.

The Augustinian Recollects established a mission in Linao, in the vicinity of present-day Bunawan, in 1614. However, mission work was hampered by the hostility of the surrounding Manobo tribes. At the height of the power of the Sultanate of Maguindanao in the mid-17th century, the Manobos of the Agusan Valley were in alliance with Sultan Kudarat. Linao was attacked several times during the 1629 Caraga Revolt and the 1649 Sumuroy Revolt. Nevertheless, the Recollects were able to establish themselves in their mission work, and remained there until the middle of the 19th century.

In the late 19th century, the Recollects (under protest) turned over many of their mission territories, including those in the upper Agusan region, to the reconstituted Jesuit order (the Jesuits had been banned by Papal edict in the 1760s, and ejected from the Philippines in 1768). Missionary work was interrupted by the Philippine Revolution when the Jesuits either fled or were arrested by revolutionaries. During the American occupation, lumbering became an important activity in Agusan del Sur. Visayan migrants settled in the cleared plains, pushing indigenous communities farther into the mountainous slopes.

The territory of Agusan del Sur was governed as part of the province of Caraga during most of the Spanish period. In 1860, it was placed under the comandancia of Butuan, a district of the province of Surigao. Bienvenido Ronquillo Blanco , Former Deputy Leader of Gibung District of Agusan was named several place of Agusan. In 1914, the province of Agusan was created by the American government.

In the Second World War, Japanese troops landed in the province of Agusan in 1942 and occupied the province until their defeat by combined U.S. and Philippine Commonwealth troops as well as recognized guerrilla units in 1945 at the Battle of Agusan.

The general headquarters and military camp and base of the Philippine Commonwealth Army was active from January 3, 1942, to June 30, 1946, and the 10th Infantry Regiment of the Philippine Constabulary was active again from October 28, 1944, to June 30, 1946, are military stationed in the province of Surigao was composed to engaging operations against the Japanese Occupation.

In 1945, Filipino soldiers of the 6th, 10th, 101st, 102nd, 103rd, 107th and 110th Infantry Division of the Philippine Commonwealth Army and the 10th Infantry Regiment of the Philippine Constabulary together with the recognized Agusan guerrilla fighter units against the Japanese forces beginning the liberation in Northern Agusan during World War II.

During World War II, a unit of the joint Philippine-American defense force was located at Manot, Talacogon, in the interior of the Agusan Valley.

The province of Agusan del Sur was established on June 17, 1967, under Republic Act No. 4969 providing for the division of the province of Agusan into Agusan del Norte and Agusan del Sur. In January 1970, the first set of provincial officials assumed office after the provincial election of November, 1969. The same law provided that the capital of Agusan del Sur be the municipality of Prosperidad. The Government Center has been set up in Barangay Patin-ay.

Cultural history
The history of Agusan del Sur is essentially linked with that of its sister province, Agusan del Norte.

The aborigines of Agusan del Sur are the ancestors of the present day Mamanwas, who were driven to the hinterlands by waves of Malay immigrants. These immigrants, in turn, sought the protection of the interior jungles because of the forays and the constant raids of "moro" pirates. The "moros" being seafaring people confined themselves to the coastal areas, where they started their settlements.

Geography

Land area

The municipalities of Loreto, La Paz, Esperanza, and San Luis are the four largest municipalities in land area comprising almost 60% of the province's total land area. Santa Josefa and Talacogon, also river towns, have the smallest land area.

Present land use, however, showed that settlements and commercial areas already occupy some of the forestlands.

Through the years, the province has lost much of its forest resources because existing industries are extractive in nature.

Topography
Agusan del Sur is an elongated basin formation with mountain ranges in the eastern and western sides forming a valley, which occupies the central longitudinal section of the land. The Agusan River, which flows from Davao de Oro in the south towards Agusan del Norte in the north, runs almost in the middle of the valley and empties at Butuan Bay. The river has twelve tributaries: Wawa, Gibong and Simulao Rivers in the eastern side and Ojot, Pusilao, Kasilayan, Libang, Maasam, Adgawan, Cawayan, Umayam and Ihaon Rivers in the western side. These tributaries are fed by streams and creeks. The southern half of the province from the municipality of Veruela is an area filled with swamps and lakes, the biggest of which is Talacogon Lake.

Climate
The climate map of the Philippines based on the modified coronas classification shows that the province falls under Type II.

Type II climate has no dry season with very pronounced wet season of heavy precipitation. Maximum rainfall generally occurs from December to January although there is no single dry month. Areas characterized by this climate type are generally along or very near the eastern coast thus are open to the northeast monsoon.

Agusan del Sur is among the 20 most vulnerable provinces to climate change in the Philippines.

Administrative divisions
Agusan del Sur comprises 13 municipalities and 1 city. There are 314 barangays.

Demographics

In 2000, the province had a population of 559,294. This represented an increase of 44,558 persons or 7.96% since 1995. The annual population growth rate was 1.79%. The 103,637 households had an average household size of 5.39 persons. The population density was 62 persons per square kilometer, with a male to female ratio of 107:100.

Five tribal groups are found in the province: Aeta, Mamanwa, Bagobo, Higaonon, and Manobo. The Manobos live along the national highway and river towns towards the boundary with Davao de Oro. The Higaonons live mostly on the western side of Agusan River, generally in Esperanza towards the boundary with Bukidnon.

The Agusan del Sur population is predominantly composed of immigrants from the Visayas. Intermarriages between immigrants and natives have pulled down the percentage of the lumad stock.

Cebuano is the most common language spoken in Agusan del Sur.

Religion
The predominant religion is Roman Catholicism with 79% of the population and the Iglesia Filipina Independiente with 12%. Other religions include the Seventh-day Adventist Church, Iglesia ni Cristo, United Pentecostal Church, Born Again and the United Church of Christ in the Philippines, Islam and Latter Day Saints.

Economy

Based on the 1995 census, 75% of the labor force is engaged in agriculture and forestry. Rice, corn and fruits are among the major agricultural crops.

Human resources
Agusan del Sur has a labor force of 287,000 people, mostly in the agriculture and forestry sector. Several colleges, including a university, add to a trainable, English-speaking workforce. The province also has educational establishments offering skills development courses in Information Technology.

Agriculture
The province's rice production has the estimated capacity to feed 1,072,456 people—far more than the province's population. Ironically, rice insufficiency persists, especially in the upland and hard to reach barangays.

Corn plantations cover  for both white and yellow corn with a total production of 55,767 t in 2000 with surplus corn grits of 31,106 MT enough to feed more than 2 million people, four times greater than the province's population.

Banana chips are also processed in the province.

The plantation is a Malaysian-Filipino joint venture, with agrarian reform beneficiaries as land owners. Crude oil is processed in the sites of Rosario, and Trento.

Coconut trees are widespread in the province, covering .

Poultry and livestock
Despite the government's efforts to increase poultry and livestock production, deficits in meat supply persist. Processed poultry and beef are imported from Davao City and Cagayan de Oro.

Fish
Agusan del Sur is highly dependent on Surigao del Sur and other provinces for the supply of marine products. However, the province has abundant supply of fresh water fish like mudfish, catfish and tilapia.

Government
Agusan del Sur has two congressional districts encompassing its 13 municipalities and 1 component city.

History
Rufino C. Otero was elected as the first Provincial Governor and Democrito O. Plaza the first Congressman in the election of November 1969. The term of office of Congressman Democrito O. Plaza would have continued until December 1973 had it not for the proclamation of Martial Law on September 21, 1972, which in effect abolished the Congress. When the Interim Batasang Pambansa was convened in 1978 after almost a decade of absence under the martial Law, Edelmiro Amante represented the province in the National Assembly.

Tourism

Attractions 
 Agusan Marsh Wildlife Sanctuary—the largest wetland in the Philippines and the biggest marsh in Southeast Asia
 Pinandagatan Falls—located in Barangay New Tubigon, Sibagat, Agusan del Sur, a newly discovered untouched hidden paradise. According to Caraga Backpackers Group, Pinandagatan Falls could be the best waterfalls they saw in the entire Caraga Region
 Managong Falls—located in Barangay Padiay, Sibagat, Agusan del Sur, known to be the tallest waterfalls in the province and the strongest running waterfalls in Caraga Region.
 Bega Falls—located in Barangay Mabuhay, Prosperidad, Agusan del Sur
 Camponay Falls—located in Barangay Tabontabon, Sibagat, Agusan del Sur, a cave can be found in the middle of the waterfalls within secondary forests, which has potential as a local outdoor and recreation site
 Togongon Falls—located in Barangay Kolambugan, Sibagat, Agusan del Sur
 Binaba Falls—located in Barangay Mabuhay, Prosperidad, Agusan del Sur
 Tugonan Falls—located in Barangay San Lorenzo, Prosperidad, Agusan del Sur
 Wawa River (Agusan del Sur)—located in the municipalities of Sibagat, Bayugan, and Esperanza, Agusan del Sur
 Agusan River—a 250-kilometer river located in the municipalities of Santa Josefa, Veruela, Loreto, Talacogon, San Luis, and Esperanza, Agusan del Sur
 Gibong River—located in the municipalities of Prosperidad and Talacogon, Agusan del Sur
 Bunaguit Sea of Clouds—Barangay Bunaguit, Esperanza, Agusan del Sur
Naliyagan Cultural Center—Provincial Landmark, Provincial Capitol Complex, Barangay Patin-ay, Prosperidad, Agusan del Sur
Centennial Toog Tree—more than 300 years old and stands at 65-meters high, the tallest rosewood tree in the Philippines located in San Francisco, Agusan del Sur
Mount Magdiwata Watershed—San Francisco, Agusan del Sur
Puting Buhangin Cave—Barangay Poblacion, Prosperidad, Agusan del Sur

Festivals 
 Naliyagan Festival - a week long celebration of Agusan del Sur charter day anniversary

Notable people
 Bayang Barrios—a Filipino Musician and Singer from Bunawan, Agusan del Sur
 Grace Nono—a Filipino Singer, ethnomusicologist and scholar of Philippine shamanism from Bunawan, Agusan del Sur
 Dennis Laurente—a Filipino Professional Boxer raised in Sibagat, Agusan del Sur
 Rodolfo Plaza—Former Representative, from Prosperidad, Agusan del Sur

References

External links

 
 
 The Official Website of the Provincial Government of Agusan del Sur
 More info about Agusan del Sur at the Agusan–Surigao Historical Archive (Archived 2009-10-24)
  ( 2022-06-09)
  ( 2022-06-09)

 
Provinces of the Philippines
Provinces of Caraga
States and territories established in 1967
1967 establishments in the Philippines